Amadou Bakayoko (born 1 January 1996) is a Sierra Leonean professional footballer who plays as a forward for English club Forest Green Rovers and the Sierra Leone national team.

Club career
Bakayoko was born in Sierra Leone but lived in Guinea until the age of six, before moving to the Netherlands where he lived until he was 10. After moving to England, he began playing in Birmingham before winning a scholarship at Walsall. After prolific goalscoring at youth and reserve team level, Bakayoko was offered a one-year professional contract at Walsall in December 2013. He made his debut for the "Saddlers" on 5 April, replacing Michael Ngoo 68 minutes into a 1–0 defeat to Port Vale at Vale Park.

On 9 October 2014, Bakayoko joined Conference Premier side Southport on a month's loan. He made a scoring debut as a substitute in Southport's 2–0 victory over Braintree Town. Bakayoko scored his second goal for Southport in a 3–2 victory over Nuneaton Town on 22 November 2014.

Bakayoko joined Worcester City on a one–month loan deal on 15 January 2016 and scored three league goals in the National League North for the club.

He scored his first goals for Walsall when he scored a hat-trick in an EFL Trophy tie against Grimsby Town on 30 August 2016. He scored his first league goal in a 3–2 win over Shrewsbury Town on 15 October 2016, though he was later sent off in the same match.

His contract was extended by Walsall at the end of the 2017–18 season after the club exercised an option.

On 7 August 2018, Bakayoko joined League One side Coventry City for an undisclosed fee, signing a two-year deal. On 12 May 2021, it was announced that he would leave Coventry at the end of the season, following the expiry of his contract.

On 25 June 2021, Bakayoko joined League One side Bolton Wanderers on a two-year deal. His competitive debut came on 7 August in a 3–3 draw against Milton Keynes Dons, with him scoring on his debut to put Bolton 2–1 up.

On 12 January 2023, Bakayoko joined fellow League One club Forest Green Rovers on a permanent deal for an undisclosed fee.

International career
On 17 March 2022, he was called up for the Sierra Leone national football team for the first time in his career. 

He was also eligible for the Guinea national football team.

He made his debut for Sierra Leone on 23 March 2022, as the side lost 3-0 to Togo in an international friendly. He scored his first goal for them five days later, as he scored the only goal in a 1–0 win against Liberia.

Career statistics

References

External links

Living people
1996 births
People from Kenema
Sierra Leonean footballers
Sierra Leone international footballers
Association football forwards
Walsall F.C. players
Southport F.C. players
AFC Telford United players
English Football League players
National League (English football) players
Worcester City F.C. players
Coventry City F.C. players
Bolton Wanderers F.C. players
Forest Green Rovers F.C. players
Sierra Leonean expatriate footballers
Sierra Leonean expatriate sportspeople in England
Expatriate footballers in England